Vinum Hadrianum (Greek: Adriakos, Adrianos) is a wine from Hadria or Hatria, currently known as Atri, in Picenum on the Adriatic coast of central Italy. Hadrianum was already ancient in fame and was known as one of the good wines of the Empire.

History 
Hadrianum achieved a good reputation in the 1st century AD. Pliny rated Hadrianum as one of the good wines, along with Mamertine from Messina in Sicily, Praetutian from Ancona on the Adriatic, Rhaetic from Verona, Luna from Tuscany, and Genoa from Liguria.

Hadrianum was also praised by two Greek Augustan poets, Antiphilos of Byzantium and Antipater of Thessaloniki. Augustus also mentioned that a good vintage wine produced in Hatria was called Hadrianum.

The amphorae 
The region of Atri was known for its production of amphorae. In the middle of the 2nd century BC, a discovery was made and found broken amphorae, which had lids in the form of a small disc with a diameter of 10 cm and a small knob in the center with archaic letters written around it that read Hatria. Some of these amphorae had writings that read as Hatria(num). These amphorae contained the Vinum Hadrianum.

See also 

 Ancient Rome and wine
 History of wine

References 

Wine